Chiu Yu Ming (born 9 November 1991 in Hong Kong), is a former Hong Kong professional footballer who played as a goalkeeper.

Club career

Tai Po
Chiu joined Tai Po youth system and was promoted to the first team in the 2010–11 season, serving as the backup of Pang Tsz Kin.

Hong Kong Sapling
In the 2011–12 season, as Mutual refused to promote to the top-tier division, a team of youth players formed Hong Kong Sapling. Chiu was loaned to the team and originally served as a backup of Tsang Man Fai. However, due to the departure of Tsang Man Fai, he became the first-choice goalkeeper. He returned to Tai Po after the season.

Southern
Chiu joined newly promoted First Division club Southern for an undisclosed fee.

International career
On 19 June 2012, Chiu was called up into the final squad for the 2013 AFC U-22 Asian Cup qualification in Laos. However, he did not feature any matches as Tsang Man Fai played every match.

On 21 June 2013, Chiu was again chosen into the training squad for the 2013 East Asian Games.

Career statistics

Club
 As of 23 June 2013

References

Hong Kong footballers
1991 births
Living people
Association football goalkeepers
Hong Kong First Division League players
Hong Kong Premier League players
Tai Po FC players
Dreams Sports Club players
Southern District FC players
Yuen Long FC players
Hong Kong Rangers FC players